The Magnificent Concubine is a 1962 Hong Kong drama film. This movie was filmed in color. It was directed by Li Han Hsiang and is a remake of the 1955 Kenji Mizoguchi film Yōkihi. The Magnificent Concubine was entered into the 1962 Cannes Film Festival. It was the first Chinese-language film to win the Grand Prix for Best Interior Photography and Color.

Cast
 Hsin Yen Chao
 Wen Shin Chen
 Bin He
 Wen Chung Ku
 Hsiang Chun Li
 Li Li-hua
 Ching Lin
 Ying Li
 Ti Tang
 Chih-Ching Yang
 Chun Yen
 Zhao Lei
 Mu Zhu as Rebellious captain

References

External links

1962 films
1962 drama films
Hong Kong drama films
1960s Mandarin-language films
Films directed by Li Han-hsiang
Films set in 8th-century Tang dynasty